Jelic or Jelić is a common Croatian and Serbian family name. Notable people with the surname include:

Vesna Jelić (born 1982), Croatian female volleyball player
Vinko Jelić (born 1596), Croatian baroque composer
Chris Jelic (born 1963), retired US Major League Baseball player of Serbian descent
Tomislav Jelić (born 1973), Croatian musician, member of Colonia dance music band
Barbara Jelić (born 1977), former Croatian international volleyball player
Matea Jelić (born 1997), Croatian taekwondo athlete, Olympic champion
Matej Jelić (born 1990), Croatian football player
Branko Jelić (born 1977), Serbian football player
Dragi Jelić (born 1947), Serbian musician, founder of YU grupa
Dušan Jelić (born 1974), Serbian professional basketball player
Milan Jelić (1956–2007), Serb politician in Bosnia and Herzegovina
Petar Jelić (born 1986), Bosnian football currently playing for OFK Beograd
Ivan Borna Jelić Balta (born 1992), Croatian football player

See also
Yelich

References

Croatian surnames
Serbian surnames